The Medicines and Medical Devices Agency of Serbia (abbr. ALIMS) is a Serbian national authority responsible for regulation and surveillance of the development, manufacturing and sale of human and veterinary drugs and medical devices. Its task is also to ensure that both individual patients and healthcare professionals have access to safe and effective medicinal products.

Medicines and Medical Devices Agency of Serbia was founded by the Serbian Law on Medicines and Medical Devices in 2004, thus replacing previously existing Medicines Bureau of Yugoslavia (established in 1948) and Institute for testing and control of medicines of Serbia (established in 1960).

The Medicines and Medical Devices Agency of Serbia is a government body under the aegis of the Serbian Ministry of Health. Its operations are largely financed through fees. Approximately 180 people work at the agency; most are pharmacists and doctors.

See also 
 Regulation of therapeutic goods
 European Medicines Agency

External links 
 

Pharmaceutical industry
National agencies for drug regulation
Medical and health organizations based in Serbia
Drugs in Serbia